Eurybotas of Crete was the toxarch (τοξάρχης), meaning captain of the archers, in the army of Alexander the Great,  a position to which he may have been summoned already by the Philip II, when he planned his Asiatic campaign. Eurybotas was killed, along with seventy of his men, in the Siege of Thebes in 335 BC. His successor appears to have been Ombrion (Ὀμβρίον) of Crete.

Cretan archers were highly skilled and were an essential part of Greek military tactics.  The Cretan archers were generally mercenaries.

References

Who's Who in the Age of Alexander the Great by Waldemar Heckel 

4th-century BC Greek people
335 BC deaths
Ancient Cretan generals
Generals of Alexander the Great
Generals of Philip II of Macedon
Ancient Greek archers
Military archers
Year of birth unknown